Pi Mensae (π Men), also known as HD 39091, is a yellow dwarf star in the constellation of Mensa. This star has a high proper motion. The apparent magnitude is 5.67, which can be visible to the naked eye in exceptionally dark, clear skies. It is nearly 60 light-years away. The star is slightly larger than the Sun in terms of mass, size, luminosity, temperature and metallicity, and is about 730 million years younger. It hosts three known planets.

Planetary system
On October 15, 2001, an extrasolar planet was found orbiting the star. Because of its eccentricity, and being a massive brown dwarf that passes through the habitable zone, it would have disrupted the orbits of any Earth-like planets, and possibly thrown them into the star, or out into the interstellar medium.

Incorporating more accurate Hipparcos data yields a mass range for the companion to be anywhere from 10.27 to 29.9 times that of Jupiter, confirming its substellar nature with the upper limit of mass putting it in the brown dwarf range.
In 2020, the true mass of Pi Mensae b was measured to be  via astrometry. Since this is greater than 13 Jupiter masses, the object could be considered a brown dwarf, although more recent astrometric results suggest a slightly lower mass. Pi Mensae was ranked 100th on the list of top 100 target stars for the planned (but now-canceled) Terrestrial Planet Finder mission to search for Earth-like planets.

On September 16, 2018, a preprint was posted to arXiv detailing the discovery of a super-Earth on a 6.27-day orbit around the star, the first exoplanet detection by the Transiting Exoplanet Survey Satellite (TESS) submitted for publication. This was confirmed two days later, where the attention was called that the system is amenable for future planet atmospheric studies.

In 2020, an analysis with Gaia DR2 and Hipparcos astrometry showed that planets b and c are located on orbits mutually inclined by 49°−131° (1 sigma), which causes planet c to not transit most of the time, and acquire large misalignments with its host star's spin axis. 

Planet c likely formed on a wide orbit, and then migrated inward under the gravitational influence of the planet or brown dwarf b. It is likely to retain a portion of primordial, highly volatile atmosphere.

In 2022, the discovery by the radial velocity method of a third planet, Pi Mensae d, on a 125-day orbit was announced. Another 2022 study did not confirm this planet, but a 2023 study did detect it.

See also
 Gliese 777
 HD 70642
 Lists of exoplanets

References

External links
 The Extrasolar Planet Encyclopedia: HD 39091
 Solstation: Pi Mensae
 SIMBAD: Pi Mensae
 ARICNS: Pi Mensae

G-type main-sequence stars
Planetary systems with two confirmed planets
Mensa (constellation)
Mensae, Pi
CD-80 00195
9189
039091
026394
2022
144